Sir George Christie Gibbons, KC (2 July 1848 in St. Catharines, Upper Canada – 8 August 1918) was a Canadian lawyer and businessman. The chairman of the Canadian section of the International Waterways Commission, he was knighted in 1911 for his part in the conclusion of the Boundary Waters Treaty of 1909.

References 
 Profile at the Dictionary of Canadian Biography

1848 births
1918 deaths
19th-century Canadian businesspeople
19th-century Canadian lawyers
Canadian Knights Bachelor
Canadian King's Counsel
Upper Canada College alumni